Caisson (French for "box") may refer to:

 Caisson (Asian architecture), a spider web ceiling
 Caisson (engineering), a sealed underwater structure
 Caisson (lock gate), a gate for a dock or lock, constructed as a floating caisson
 Caisson (pen name), of Edward Sperling
 Caisson (western architecture), a type of coffer
 Caisson disease, or decompression sickness
 Caisson lock, a type of canal lock
 Deep foundation, also called a caisson foundation
 Limbers and caissons, a two-wheeled cart for carrying ammunition, also used in certain state and military funerals

See also 
 Kazon, a fictional alien race in Star Trek 
 Khe Sanh